Bank of Africa Rwanda Limited also BOA Rwanda, formerly known as Agaseke Bank, is a commercial bank in Rwanda. The bank is one of the licensed banks in the Republic of Rwanda. The bank is a growing financial services provider in Rwanda. As of December 2012, its total assets were valued at approximately US$14.6 million (RWF:9.2 billion).

History
BOA Rwanda was formed in November 2003 as Centre Financier aux Entrepreneurs Agaseke (CFE SA Agaseke) with the aim of providing financial services to small and medium-sized businesses. On 14 December 2010, the shareholders adopted a resolution to convert  CFE SA Agaseke to a microfinance bank and adopted the name Agaseke Bank. The bank was granted a banking license by the National Bank of Rwanda, the national banking regulator, in 2011 and commenced commercial banking services in the same year.

On October 15, 2015, the Bank of Africa Group announced its acquisition of a 90% stake in Agaseke Bank. This led to Agaske Bank changing its name to Bank of Africa Rwanda Limited and conversion to a commercial bank.

Ownership
The stock of the bank is privately owned by institutional and individual investors. , the shareholding in the bank is as depicted in the table below:

Branches
As of August 2017,  the bank maintained the following interlinked branches.

(1) Main Branch, Ground Floor, Chic Complex, Nyarugege, Kigali (2) Kayonza Branch (3) Gizozi Branch, Umukindo House, Kigali (4) Muhanga Branch (5) Rusizi Branch (6) Rubavu Branch (7) Musanze Branch (8) Huye Branch (9) Nyabugogo Branch (10) Remera Branch (10) Gikondo Branch (11) Kamironko Branch (12) Nyarugege Branch, KIC House, Kigali (12) Soras Outlet, Kakuyu Street, Kigali and (13) Kabuga Branch.

See also

 List of banks in Rwanda
 Economy of Rwanda
 Bank of Africa Group
 Bank of Africa Kenya Limited
 Bank of Africa Uganda Limited
 Bank of Africa Ghana Limited

References

External links
 Moroccan investors gain access to Rwanda market through local firms 
 Website of Rwanda National Bank

Banks of Rwanda
Banks established in 2003
2011 establishments in Rwanda
Organisations based in Kigali
Economy of Kigali